UFC 46: Supernatural was a mixed martial arts event held by the Ultimate Fighting Championship on January 31, 2004, at the Mandalay Bay Events Center in Las Vegas, Nevada. The event was broadcast live on pay-per-view in the United States, and later released on DVD.

History
Headlining the card was a UFC Light Heavyweight Championship bout between Randy Couture and Vitor Belfort. The evening marked the UFC debut of future welterweight champion Georges St-Pierre.

Results

Fighter Payouts
The total fighter payroll for UFC 46 was $540,500.

Vitor Belfort: $130,000 ($100,000 for fighting; $30,000 win bonus)
Randy Couture: $120,000 ($120,000 for fighting; win bonus would have been $80,000)
Frank Mir: $90,000 ($60,000 for fighting; $30,000 win bonus)
Matt Hughes: $55,000 ($55,000 for fighting; win bonus would have been $55,000)
B.J. Penn: $50,000 ($25,000 for fighting; $25,000 win bonus)
Carlos Newton: $30,000 ($30,000 for fighting; win bonus would have been $0)
Matt Serra: $16,000 ($8,000 for fighting; $8,000 win bonus)
Renato Verissimo: $10,000 ($5,000 for fighting; $5,000 win bonus)
Josh Thomson: $8,000 ($4,000 for fighting; $4,000 win bonus)
Lee Murray: $6,000 ($3,000 for fighting; $3,000 win bonus)
Georges St-Pierre: $6,000 ($3,000 for fighting; $3,000 win bonus)
Hermes Franca: $6,000 ($6,000 for fighting; win bonus would have been $6,000)
Wes Sims: $5,000 ($5,000 for fighting, win bonus would have been $5,000)
Jorge Rivera: $3,000 ($3,000 for fighting; win bonus would have been $3,000)
Karo Parisyan: $3,000 ($3,000 for fighting; win bonus would have been $3,000)
Jeff Curran: $2,500 ($2,500 for fighting; win bonus would have been $2,000)

See also
 Ultimate Fighting Championship
 List of UFC champions
 List of UFC events
 2004 in UFC

References

External links
Official UFC past events page

Ultimate Fighting Championship events
2004 in mixed martial arts
Mixed martial arts in Las Vegas
2004 in sports in Nevada